JWH-372 (naphthalen-1-yl-[1-pentyl-5-[2-(trifluoromethyl)phenyl]pyrrol-3-yl]methanone) is a synthetic cannabinoid from the naphthoylpyrrole family which acts as a potent and selective agonist of the CB2 receptor. 
JWH-372 binds approximately 9 times stronger to the CB2 receptor (Ki = 8.2 ± 0.2nM) than the CB1 receptor (Ki = 77 ± 2nM). The selectivity of JWH-372 for the CB2 receptor is likely due to the electron-withdrawing character of the trifluoromethyl group rather than steric effects, as the o-methyl compound JWH-370 was only mildly selective for the CB2 receptor (CB1 Ki = 5.6 ± 0.4nM, CB2 Ki = 4.0 ± 0.5nM).

Legality
In the United States JWH-372 is not federally scheduled, although some states have passed legislation banning the sale, possession, and manufacture of JWH-372.

In Canada, JWH-372 and other naphthoylpyrrole-based cannabinoids are Schedule II controlled substances under the Controlled Drugs and Substances Act.

In the United Kingdom, JWH-372 and other naphthoylpyrrole-based cannabinoids are considered Class B drugs under the Misuse of Drugs Act 1971.

See also
List of JWH cannabinoids
Synthetic cannabinoid

References 

JWH cannabinoids
CB1 receptor agonists
CB2 receptor agonists
Designer drugs
Naphthoylpyrroles
Trifluoromethyl compounds